The Freedom 45 is an American sailboat, that was designed by Gary Mull and first built in 1987. The design is out of production.

The Freedom 45 is a development of the Freedom 42, created by extending the aft section of the hull.

Production
The boat was built by Tillotson Pearson in the United States for Freedom Yachts, starting in 1987.

Design
The Freedom 45 is a small recreational keelboat, built predominantly of fiberglass, with wood trim. It has a free-standing fractional sloop, an internally-mounted rudder and a fixed wing keel. It displaces  and carries  of ballast.

The boat has a PHRF racing average handicap of 99 with a high of 99 and low of 102.

Variants
Freedom 45 AC
Model with an aft cockpit configuration.
Freedom 45 CC
Model with a center cockpit configuration.

See also
List of sailing boat types

References

Keelboats
1980s sailboat type designs
Sailing yachts
Sailboat type designs by Gary Mull
Sailboat types built by Pearson Yachts